Balashikhinsky District was an administrative and municipal district (raion) of Moscow Oblast, Russia. Its administrative center was the city of Balashikha.  Population:  The population of Balashikha accounted for 95.6% of the district's total population.

The district was abolished on January 1, 2011 and reorganized as Balashikha City Under Oblast Jurisdiction.

References

Districts of Moscow Oblast